Spit It Out may refer to:

 Spit It Out (TV series), a 2010 Australian children's game show
 "Spit It Out" (Slipknot song), 1999
 "Spit It Out" (IAMX song), 2006